Makkonen is a Finnish surname. Notable people with the surname include:

 Jussi Makkonen (born 1985), Finnish ice hockey player
 Kari Makkonen (born 1955), Finnish ice hockey player
 Leo Makkonen (born 1948), Orthodox Archbishop of Finland
 Matti Makkonen (1952–2015), Finnish engineer
 Sini-Maria Makkonen (born 1986), Finnish rapper known by her stage name Sini Sabotage

See also 
 The Weeknd, Canadian singer whose middle name is Makkonen

References 

Finnish-language surnames